Lawrence Edwin Pollard  (born 21 May 1942) was High Commissioner of Barbados in London 2003 until 2008.

Pollard joined Barclays Bank, and served it as Staff and Industrial Relations Manager, Assistant Caribbean Director, Personal Sector and Offshore Director and Product Development and Marketing Director. He was a member of the board of the Barbados Institute Banking and Finance, the Securities Exchange of Barbados and FCIB.

References 

1942 births
Barbadian corporate directors
Living people
Officers of the Order of the British Empire
High Commissioners of Barbados to the United Kingdom
People educated at Combermere School
Barclays people